Osteoglossum is a genus of fish in the family Osteoglossidae.

These predators mostly feed on arthropods like insects and spiders, but may also take small vertebrates such as other fish, frogs, lizards, snakes, mice, bats and small birds. They jump up to  out of the water to pick the prey off branches, tree trunks or foliage, which has earned them the local name "water monkeys". They are the largest fish in the world that catch most of their food out of water. When breeding, the male protects the eggs and young by carrying them in the mouth.

They are sometimes kept in aquariums, but they are predatory and require a very large tank.

Species
There are two species:

References

Osteoglossidae
Taxa named by Georges Cuvier